Clyde Butcher (born 1942) is an American large-format camera photographer known for wilderness photography of the Florida landscape. He began his career doing color photography before switching to large-scale black-and-white landscape photography after the death of his son. Butcher is a strong advocate of conservation efforts and uses his work to promote awareness of the beauty of natural places.

Background
Born in Kansas City, Missouri, Clyde Butcher led a nomadic childhood with his parents, until they settled in Southern California when he was 18. He attended California Polytechnic University in 1960 and graduated in architecture. While visiting Yosemite National Park in 1963, he learned about the photography studies of Ansel Adams.

During his senior year of college, Butcher married his college sweetheart Niki.

Beginnings of photography career
During college, Butcher presented his architecture projects by creating and photographing miniature-scale models instead of making drawings.

After graduation, Butcher began a career in architecture. He worked with architect William Pereira on such buildings as the Transamerica building in San Francisco and worked for architectural model companies. With the downturn in the economy, Clyde lost his job and began showing his black and white images at local art festivals.  He soon realized that he could make more money in photography than he was making in architecture.  By 1970, he left architecture for landscape photography.

Commercial success
Eventually, Butcher had a partnership that marketed and sold his images to the wall décor departments of Sears, Montgomery Ward, and J. C. Penney. He eventually accrued around 200 employees and offices in Akron, Ohio and Southern California. In order to increase sales, Butcher started photographing with color film so his images could match the avocado green shag carpets and gold couches. The bulk of his photography during this time took place west of the Rocky Mountains and in the Pacific Northwest.

To escape some of the stress of the business, he moved onto a sailboat with his wife where he lived for seven years, moored in the harbor of Newport Beach, California. The boat had no electricity or refrigeration, conditions were spartan. Living without a television on the boat gained the family a sense of peace and solitude while they could take advantage of the city.

Move to Florida
Butcher's love for boating and the television program Flipper inspired him to explore Florida. Butcher sold his business in California, moved to Florida, and returned to selling art in street festivals.

In 1986, the Butchers' son was killed when a drunk driver hit the car in which he was a passenger. Butcher retreated to the wilderness for solace and restoration. He put aside color photography and became a black-and-white landscape photographer using large-format cameras.

In 1993, Butcher purchased 14 acres in Big Cypress National Preserve in Southern Florida which is surrounded by over a million acres of wilderness. This is where he built his gallery and home. He then realized that he needed to help the public to understand the beauty of the swamp and began leading guided tours through the swamp behind his gallery in Big Cypress National Preserve. Big Cypress Gallery is open seven days a week from 10:00 - 5:00.

In 1997, Butcher began creating very large images up to 5x9' and needed a larger darkroom. He purchased a building in an industrial park in Venice Florida where he also has a gallery. The darkroom is 2000 sq feet. The darkroom is open to the public twice a year for tours. The gallery is open Tuesday - Friday from 10:00-4:00.

A third gallery recently opened in the St. Armand's Circle area, off the coast of Sarasota, Florida.

Conservation work
Butcher's deep appreciation for the Everglades inspired him to work for the restoration and preservation of the environment. He has received recognition for his community service as well as his photography. In 1992, PBS aired a documentary about him, Visions of Florida, which won a Wolfson Award.

Butcher and his work have also inspired other artist-conservationists, such as film producer Elam Stoltzfus, who was struck by Clyde's art. The pair have formed a friendship over the years and have collaborated on several multimedia projects together as a result. Butcher hosted the documentaries "Big Cypress Swamp: The Western Everglades" and "Kissimmee Basin: The Northern Everglades," sister films that highlighted the importance of conservation and art in the state of Florida.

Clyde Butcher's photographs have been exhibited in many museums across the country including:
 Museum of Florida History - Tallahassee, FL
 Museum of Fine Arts - St. Petersburg, FL
 National Gallery of Art - Prague, Czech Republic
 South Florida Museum - Bradenton, FL
 Museum of the Rockies - Bozeman, MT
 Museum of Discovery and Science - Ft. Lauderdale, FL
 Gallery of Classic Photography (group exhibit) - Moscow, Russia
 Annenberg Space for Photography (group exhibit) - Los Angeles, CA
 Orlando Museum of Art - Orlando, FL
 Boca Raton Museum of Art - Boca Raton, Florida
 Fernbank Museum of Natural History - Atlanta, GA
 Muscarelle Museum of Art, College of William and Mary - Williamsburg, VA
 Jacksonville Museum of Modern Art - Jacksonville, FL
 Dbuque Museum of Art - Dubuque, IA
 Bergstorm-Mahler Museum - Neenah, WI
 Ringling Museum of Art (in conjunction with Ansel Adams) - Sarasota, FL
 Ft. Lauderdale Museum of Art - Ft. Lauderdale, FL
 Lowe Art Museum -Miami, Florida
 Appleton Museum - Ocala, FL
 Museum of Art (in conjunction with Ansel Adams) - Ft. Lauderdale, FL

Legacy and awards

Photography
 1998, Florida Artist Hall of Fame Award 
 2000, Ansel Adams Award from the Sierra Club
 2003, Florida Monthly Magazine - Best Florida Artist
 2005, North American Nature Photography Association, Lifetime Achievement Award in Nature Photography 
 2006, Best Florida Artist,  Florida Magazine Best of Florida 2006
 2004, Best gallery in Florida
 2005, Stars in the Arts Award
 2005, North American Nature Photography Association Lifetime Achievement Award 2005

Community service
 1996, Heartland Community Service Award
 1997, Everglades Coalition Award
 1997, "Person of the Week", presented by Peter Jennings on ABC News)
 1997, American Planning Association - Florida Chapter Service Award
 1998, South Eastern Region Nature Conservancy Conservation Colleague Award
 1999, Keeping Florida Beautiful - Adopt-A-Highway Public Service Award
 2000, Ansel Adams, conservation award
 2004, Wolfsom Telly Award
 2004, Top 100 Most Influential People in Florida
 2005, Florida International University Humanitarian of the Year Award
 2005, Lifetime Achievement Award - North American Nature Photography Association
 2006, Conservancy Eagle Award - Conservancy of South West Florida
 2008, Estuary Guardian of the Year Award - Estuary Conservation Association
 2008, Stars Arts Award - Paradise Coast
 2010, Crystal Vision Award - League of Environmental Educators of Florida
 2011, Gulf Shore Life Magazine - Man of the Year
 2011, Distinguished Artist Award - From Florida House Embassy Washington, DC
 2012, Biff Lampton Conservation Communicator of the Year Award - Florida Wildlife Federation
 2013, Voice of the Arts Award - Naples International Film Festival
 2016, Brush of Excellence Award - Sanibel Captiva Conservation Foundation

Further reading
"Who Will Be the Next Ansel Adams?", Popular Photography Magazine, 2004

References

External links 
 Clyde Butcher's website
 Ansel Adams & Clyde Butcher
 "Film on Aquatic Preserves wins national award", Florida Department of Environmental Protection
 "Clyde Butcher, A Photographer In The Heart Of The Everglades", Shutterbug, February 2004
 St Paul Public Library
 C. Butcher, Clyde on Indexmod Encyclopedia of Art and Fashion

1942 births
Living people
Artists from Kansas City, Missouri
American photographers
American environmentalists
People from Florida
Sierra Club awardees